The Government of Serbia under Vojislav Koštunica as the Prime Minister was formed on March 3, 2004. After 2007 Serbian parliamentary election on 21 January, this cabinet served as a transitional government handling only technical issues until the new government was finally formed in May 2007.

This government of Serbia consisted of four political parties - DSS (10 portfolios), G-17 Plus (4 portfolios), SPO & NS (7 portfolios and their subsidiary parties) with parliamentary support of the SPS.

During Koštunica's administration, most of the 24 disputed privatizations took place, for which there are serious suspicions that there were large-scale embezzlements. Large number of privatizations were later annulled due to non-fulfillment of privatization contracts or those companies went bankrupt.

Composition

Changes
Dragan Maršićanin, Minister of Economy, resigned from his position in order to run at the presidential elections in June 2004. After finishing in fourth place, he was sent to Switzerland as an ambassador. The Ministry of Economy was then restructured and renamed into the Ministry of Industry and Privatization. On October 19, 2004, Minister of International Economic Relations Predrag Bubalo became Maršićanin's replacement as the new Minister of Industry and Privatization.
Because Predrag Bubalo left his position as the Minister of International Economic Relations, that job went to Milan Parivodić on the same day October 19, 2004.
Ljiljana Čolić was forced to leave the position of Education and Sport Minister on September 16, 2004 after she made several controversial decisions. These decisions concerned her interference into the Biology schoolbook contents when she demanded evolution part to be equalized with creationist theory. On October 19, 2004 Slobodan Vuksanović was named as her replacement.
Deputy Prime Minister Miroljub Labus resigned on his position on May 3, 2006 after the EU froze talks with Serbia on accession. Labus was the head of the EU accession team but the government failed to arrest Ratko Mladić, which was the principal condition of the EU to further pursue talks with Serbia.
Ivana Dulić-Marković had resigned from the position of Minister of Agriculture, Forestry and Water Management on June 15, 2006, as she had been nominated to become the new Deputy Prime Minister, the position she was elected for on June 20, 2006.
On the same day Dulic was named new Deputy PM, Goran Živkov got named as her replacement as the new Minister of Agriculture, Forestry and Water Management.
All Ministers, members of G17+ party, resigned on October 1 due to the fact EU stopped the accession negotiations with Serbia. These ministers are Ivana Dulić-Marković, Mlađan Dinkić, Goran Živkov, Tomica Milosavljević. These resignations will be effective after the session of parliament and the parliament will probably not have any further sessions before elections, which are now inevitable as the Government does not have the support of the Parliament.

See also
Cabinet of Serbia (2000–01)
Cabinet of Serbia (2001–04)
Cabinet of Serbia (2007–08)
Cabinet of Serbia (2008–12)
Cabinet of Serbia (2012–14)

References 

Cabinets of Serbia
2004 establishments in Serbia
2007 disestablishments in Serbia
Cabinets established in 2004
Cabinets disestablished in 2007